The 2007 Souk El Had bombing occurred on February 13, 2007, when a car bomb filled with explosives detonated against the headquarters of the Gendarmerie Nationale in the town of Souk El Had, Boumerdès Province, Algeria destroying buildings and injuring 8. The Al-Qaeda Organization in the Islamic Maghreb was suspected as being responsible.

See also
 Terrorist bombings in Algeria
 List of terrorist incidents, 2007

References

Boumerdès Province
Suicide car and truck bombings in Algeria
Mass murder in 2007
Terrorist incidents in Algeria
Terrorist incidents in Algeria in 2007
2007 murders in Algeria
Islamic terrorism in Algeria